Ian Redmond (born 14 June 1942) is a Zimbabwean sports shooter. He competed in two events at the 1980 Summer Olympics.

References

External links
 

1942 births
Living people
Zimbabwean male sport shooters
Olympic shooters of Zimbabwe
Shooters at the 1980 Summer Olympics
Place of birth missing (living people)